Branislav Varsik (5 March 1904, Myjava, Austria-Hungary – 28 May 1994, Slovakia) was a Slovak historian and archivist. His major contribution was to the research of the hussite movement on the territory of present-day Slovakia and history of the settlement.

Selected works
 Slováci na pražskej univerzite do konca stredoveku [Slovaks at the University of Prague until the end of the Middle Ages] (1926)
 Husiti a reformácia na Slovensku do žilinskej synody [Hussites and Reformation in Slovakia before the Synod of Žilina] (1932, habilitation work)
 Národnostný problém trnavskej univerzity [The National Problem of Trnava University] (1938)
 Národnostná hranica slovensko-maďarská v ostatných dvoch storočiach [The Slovak-Hungarian national border in the last two centuries] (1940)
 Slovenské listy a listiny z 15. a 16. stor. [Slovak Letters and Documents of the 15th and 16th Centuries.] (1956, doktorská práca)
 Osídlenie Košickej kotliny I.-III. [Settlement of the Košice basin I.-III.] (1964, 1973, 1977)
 Husitské revolučné hnutie a Slovensko [Hussite Revolutionary Movement and Slovakia] (1965)
 Zo slovenského stredoveku [From the Slovak Middle Ages] (1972)
 Z osídlenia západného a stredného Slovenska v stredoveku [About the Settlement of Western and Central Slovakia in the Middle Ages] (1984)

Awards
 1963 – Gold Medal of Comenius University
 1963 – Honour Badge of Labour
 1974 – Gold Honor Plaque of Slovak Academy of Sciences of Ľudovít Štúr for Contributions in Social Sciences
 1976 – National Award of Slovak Socialistic Republic
 1979 – Silver medal of Slovak Academy of Sciences
 2007 – Order of Ľudovít Štúr, 1st Class in memoriam

External links 
 https://web.archive.org/web/20130925123150/http://www.fphil.uniba.sk/index.php?id=546

1904 births
1994 deaths
20th-century Slovak historians
Order of Ľudovít Štúr